Antonio Riva (21 July 1870 – 18 December 1942) was a Swiss politician and President of the Swiss Council of States (1933/1934).

External links 
 
 

1870 births
1942 deaths
Members of the Council of States (Switzerland)
Presidents of the Council of States (Switzerland)